Maud Milton (1859–1945) was an English stage and screen actress. She was born in Gravesend, Kent the daughter of a Merchant Marine sea captain and educated at home. She was apprenticed to be a dancing-mistress however she made a career turn and was coached for the stage by actor John Ryder. She made her debut appearance on stage at a theatre called The Royal Aquarium April 15, 1876. She acted in many of the contemporary plays of the Victorian era as well as Shakespearean classics. She debuted and toured the U.S. in 1882–1883 though she work with Edwin Booth in 1880 while he was presenting Shakespeare in England. Other actors of note that she worked with were Wilson Barrett, Helena Modjeska, Frank Benson, John Martin-Harvey, Oscar Asche and H. B. Irving. In later years she would appear with Marie Tempest and Herbert Beerbohm Tree.

A seasoned stage veteran she first appeared in a motion picture in 1913, a short film customary to the times. For eight years appeared in a few shorts while still remaining in the theatre. Her final film was A Message from Mars (1921), a surviving film.

Filmography
The Old Wood Carver (1913)
Damaged Goods (1914)
Kill or Cure (1914)*short
The Old Flute Player (1914)*short
Janet of the Chorus (1915)*short
The Criminal (1915)*short
The Ruling Power (1915)*short
A Message from Mars (1921)

References

External links
Maud Milton at IBDb.com
 
cabinet card studio portrait(archived)
portraitThe Illustrated Sporting & Dramatic News 22 January 1881
A revival of Ben-Hur, circa 1902 with Robert Taber, Maud Milton third from left

1859 births
1945 deaths
Actresses from Kent
English stage actresses
People from Gravesend, Kent